Kapiri Mposhi is a constituency of the National Assembly of Zambia. It covers the town of Kapiri Mposhi in Kapiri Mposhi District of Central Province.

List of MPs

References

Constituencies of the National Assembly of Zambia
1991 establishments in Zambia
Constituencies established in 1991